Thomas Foley (c. 1695 – 3 April 1749), of Stoke Edith, Herefordshire was a British landowner and Member of Parliament.

He was the eldest son of Thomas Foley (auditor of the imprests) and inherited the latter's estates on his death in 1737.  He represented Hereford in Parliament from 1734 to 1741, and Herefordshire from 1742 to 1747.

He continued the family interest in ironmaking in the Forest of Dean, initially in partnership with his father.  However, in his time leases were not renewed as they expired, and the business declined to being a shadow of what it once had been.

He married five times.  
 Hester Andrews, daughter of Thomas Andrews and Elizabeth Young.  Children:
 Martin Andrew Foley
 Thomas Foley, created first Baron Foley of the second creation in 1776
 Mary Warter, daughter of John Warter.  Children:
 Robert Foley, Dean of Worcester
 Sarah Foley
 Elizabeth Wolstenholme, daughter of Henry Wolstenholme.  Child:
 Paul Jermyn Foley
 Elizabeth Unett, daughter of Robert Unett
 Catherine Gwyn, daughter of Francis Gwyn

Sources
Burkes Peerage

References

1690s births
1749 deaths
English ironmasters
Members of the Parliament of Great Britain for English constituencies
Politics of Herefordshire
British MPs 1734–1741
British MPs 1741–1747
Thomas